Ka'Lial Glaud (born November 9, 1990) is an American football linebacker who is currently a free agent. Glaud played college football at Rutgers.

Raised in Winslow Township, New Jersey, Glaud graduated from Winslow Township High School and made his decision to attend Rutgers based on the results of a coin toss.

College career
Glaud played college football at Rutgers.

Professional career

Tampa Bay Buccaneers
On May 6, 2013, Glaud was signed as an undrafted free agent by the Tampa Bay Buccaneers. He played there until 2015.

Dallas Cowboys
On August 3, 2015, he was signed as a free agent by the Dallas Cowboys. On September 5, 2015, he was waived-injured by the Cowboys. On the following day, he cleared waivers and was reverted to the Cowboys' injured reserve list. He spent the entire 2015 season on injured reserve with the Cowboys and was released in 2016 with an injured failed physical designation due to a concussion.

References

External links
Tampa Bay Buccaneers bio
Rutgers Scarlet Knights bio

American football linebackers
People from Winslow Township, New Jersey
Players of American football from New Jersey
Rutgers Scarlet Knights football players
Sportspeople from Camden County, New Jersey
Tampa Bay Buccaneers players
Winslow Township High School alumni
1990 births
Living people